Horse of the Year is the most prestigious honor in Thoroughbred horse racing given by racing organizations in a variety of countries around the world.

In Hong Kong, the voting for Horse of the Year is organized by the Hong Kong Jockey Club as part of its annual Hong Kong Jockey Club Champion Awards. The Judging Panel consists of six members from the Hong Kong Jockey Club and the Association of Hong Kong Racing Journalists. Past winners of the award include:

 2021-22: Golden Sixty
 2020-21: Golden Sixty
 2019-20: Exultant
 2018-19: Beauty Generation
 2017-18: Beauty Generation
 2016-17: Rapper Dragon
 2015-16: Werther
 2014-15: Able Friend
 2013-14: Designs On Rome
 2012-13: Military Attack
 2011-12: Ambitious Dragon
 2010-11: Ambitious Dragon
 2009-10: Sacred Kingdom
 2008-09: Viva Pataca
 2007-08: Good Ba Ba
 2006-07: Vengeance of Rain
 2005-06: Bullish Luck
 2004-05: Silent Witness
 2003-04: Silent Witness
 2002-03: Grand Delight
 2001-02: Electronic Unicorn
 2000-01: Fairy King Prawn
 1999-00: Fairy King Prawn
 1998-99: Indigenous
 1997-98: Oriental Express
 1996-97: Privilege
 1995-96: Mr Vitality
 1994-95: Makarpura Star
 1993-94: River Verdon
 1992-93: Helene Star
 1991-92: River Verdon
 1990-91: River Verdon
 1989-90: Quicken Away
 1988-89: Quicken Away
 1987-88: Top Grade
 1986-87: Flying Dancer
 1985-86: Yuno When
 1984-85: Mystic
 1983-84: Co-Tack
 1982-83: Co-Tack
 1981-82: Football 
 1980-81: Silver Lining
 1979-80: Top Gain
 1978-79: Silver Lining
 1977-78: Silver Lining

References
 Champion Awards at the Hong Kong Jockey Club website

Horse racing awards